The Quick Mail Transfer Protocol (QMTP) is an e-mail transmission protocol that is designed to have better performance than Simple Mail Transfer Protocol (SMTP), the de facto standard. It was designed and implemented by Daniel J. Bernstein.

QMTP uses fewer round trips, or transmissions compared to SMTP. The protocol was proposed in 1997.

External links
 QMTP Protocol definition

Internet mail protocols
Computer-related introductions in 1997